R.I.S. Roma – Delitti imperfetti is an Italian television series. It's a spin-off of RIS Delitti Imperfetti. The episodes starts from 18 of March 2010 on Canale 5.

Characters

 Lucia Brancato (2010-2012)
 Daniele Ghirelli (2010-2012)
 Emiliano Cecchi (2010-2012)
 Flavia Ayroldi (2010-2011)
 Constanza Moro (2010)
 Bartolomeo Dossena (2010-2012)
 Guido Brancato (2010)
 Orlando Serra (2011-2012)
 Bianca Proietti (2011-2012)
 Ernesto Rambaudi (2010-2012)

Production
The series start from the idea of Pietro Valsecchi and developed by Massimo Martella and Mauro Casiraghi like a story editors. The directors of the series are Fabio Tagliavia (season 1) and Francesco Miccichè  (seasons 2&3)

See also
List of Italian television series

External links
 

Italian television series
Canale 5 original programming